The Bahraini King's Cup is a cup competition involving teams from the Bahraini Premier League and 2nd tier.

Al Hadd are banned from this year's competition after they withdrew from their semi-final match against Muharraq in the 2011 Bahraini King's Cup competition.

The cup winner qualified for the 2013 AFC Cup.

First round

Second round

1Al Hadd were suspended from the competition and the game was awarded to East Riffa

Quarter finals

Semi finals

Finals

References

Bahraini King's Cup seasons
King's Cup
Bahrain